Silent mode is a setting available on mobile phones and pagers that, when activated, disables the ringtones and, in some cases, also the vibrating alerts or alarm. Unlike the airplane mode, the silent mode still allows the device to receive and send calls and messages.

This quiet option may be useful in meetings, speeches, libraries, museums, or places of worship. In some places it is mandatory to use the silent mode or to switch off the device.

References

Mobile phones